The 1970 UCI Track Cycling World Championships were the World Championship for track cycling. They took place in Leicester, United Kingdom in 1970. Eleven events were contested, 9 for men (3 for professionals, 6 for amateurs) and 2 for women.

Medal summary

Medal table

See also

 1970 UCI Road World Championships

References

Track cycling
International cycle races hosted by England
UCI Track Cycling World Championships by year
1970 in track cycling
20th century in Leicestershire
Sport in Leicester